Erbray is a commune in the Loire-Atlantique department in western France.

Population

Amenities
The town has an elementary school, a Catholic church, pharmacy, hairdresser, food shops, bakery, post office and a bar.

Personalities
 Jeanne Cherhal, singer

See also
Communes of the Loire-Atlantique department

References

Communes of Loire-Atlantique